ORP Lublin (821) is a Lublin-class minelayer-landing ship of Polish Navy, named after the city of Lublin.

Construction and career
The flag was raised on 12 October 1989. The ship is part of the 2nd Transport and Mine Ship Squadron in Świnoujście, belonging to the 8th Coastal Defense Flotilla. The ship is intended for transporting landing troops with equipment and vehicles, setting sea mines (takes 130 minutes at a time) and evacuating people. It is the first ship in the history of the Polish navy commanded by a woman.

Gallery

References

Lublin-class minelayer-landing ships
1988 ships
Ships built in Gdańsk